Odăi is a district in the Southwest side of Bucharest, Romania in Sector 5.

External links
 Odăi on the map of Bucharest

Districts of Bucharest